Cats is a 2019 musical fantasy film  based on the 1981 stage musical of the same name by Andrew Lloyd Webber, which in turn was based on the poetry collection Old Possum's Book of Practical Cats (1939) by T. S. Eliot. The film was directed by Tom Hooper, in his second feature musical following Les Misérables (2012), from a screenplay by Lee Hall and Hooper. It features an ensemble cast, including James Corden, Judi Dench, Jason Derulo, Idris Elba, Jennifer Hudson, Ian McKellen, Taylor Swift, Rebel Wilson, and Francesca Hayward in her film debut.

Filming took place from December 2018 to April 2019. It was theatrically released in the United Kingdom and the United States on 20 December 2019, by Universal Pictures, and was panned by critics and audiences alike, with criticism aimed at Hooper's direction, the visual effects, screenplay, performances, pacing and editing. Considered to be one of the worst films of all time, Cats grossed $75 million on a budget of $80–100 million, making it a box-office bomb. It is estimated to have lost Universal between $71 million and $114 million after marketing and distribution costs.

Plot 
 
Victoria, a young white cat, is left abandoned by her owner in the streets of London in the middle of the night. The alley cats, witnessing this, introduce themselves to her as the "Jellicles". Mr. Mistoffelees, Munkustrap, Cassandra and Demeter take Victoria under their wing and show her the world of the Jellicles as they prepare for the Jellicle Ball, an annual ceremony where cats must compete to be chosen to go to the Heaviside Layer and be granted a new life. 

Most of the Jellicle Ball competitors are introduced and sing about themselves: Jennyanydots, a domestic tabby who sleeps during the day and by night boosts the productivity of mice and roaches; the Rum Tum Tugger, an extravagant yet indecisive cat who riles up the others; Bustopher Jones, a bourgeois cat who boasts about his weight and shares food scraps from the garbage; Skimbleshanks, a tidy ginger cat who tap dances and supervises the operation of a train, and Gus, an aged theatrical cat who has played some of the biggest roles in history.

Victoria also happens to meet the mischievous twins, Mungojerrie and Rumpleteazer, who enjoy causing trouble and messing with things in the house of their human family. They convince Victoria to join in the fun, but leave her tangled up in some necklaces when the family dog is alerted to their presence. Luckily, Mr. Mistoffelees comes to rescue Victoria, distracting the dog and escaping with her. They return to the group just in time for the arrival of the tribe's wise and beloved matriarch, Old Deuteronomy. The Jellicle Ball commences inside the abandoned Egyptian Theatre. Victoria dances a ballet solo in the moonlight, but is distracted by Cassandra harassing Grizabella, a former glamour cat who was banished from the tribe for, among other things, her past allegiance with Macavity, a notorious criminal capable of teleportation. Victoria relates to Grizabella's feelings of abandonment. As Grizabella slinks away into the streets, Old Deuteronomy witnesses their quiet camaraderie and assures Victoria that she can become a Jellicle herself in time. 

A seductive femme fatale named Bombalurina interrupts the ball, distracting the Jellicles present with a song and dance number praising Macavity and simultaneously incapacitating them with catnip. When Macavity arrives and demands to be made the Jellicle Choice, Old Deuteronomy deems him unworthy and is subsequently kidnapped and placed with most of the other contestants that he has kidnapped. As the Jellicles recuperate, distraught over their leader's disappearance, Victoria suggests that Mr. Mistoffelees use his powers to conjure Old Deuteronomy back. He tries several times, eventually making Old Deuteronomy reappear. The cats rejoice and praise Mr. Mistoffelees, and he and Victoria dance together. Meanwhile, a thwarted Macavity and Bombalurina teleport away from his victims, who begin to free themselves via Jennyanydots' costume change. Macavity leaves his lackey, Growltiger, to walk the plank defenseless against the emancipated cats. 

Grizabella returns to the Egyptian Theatre. Victoria vouches for her and urges her to sing her true feelings. Grizabella sings a passionate ballad about her mistakes, her former glory, and her beauty, sentiments that touch the hearts of the Jellicles. Old Deuteronomy names Grizabella the Jellicle Choice and sends her off to the Heaviside Layer in a chandelier (repaired by Mr. Mistoffelees' magic to float like a hot air balloon). Macavity, in one last attempt to reach the Heaviside Layer, leaps onto a rope from the chandelier, but falls onto Nelson's Column. The Jellicles, reunited with their kidnapped brethren, and perched on a lion statue, watch Grizabella ascend as the morning sun appears above the horizon. After the congregation disperses, Old Deuteronomy welcomes Victoria to the tribe.

Cast

Production

Development
An animated film adaptation based on the musical was initially planned by Amblimation in the 1990s but was abandoned with the studio's closure.  In December 2013, Andrew Lloyd Webber, creator and composer of the musical stage production Cats, teased that Universal Pictures, which had purchased the film rights to Cats many years earlier, was putting the project into active development.

In February 2016, it was reported that Tom Hooper was in negotiations to direct the film, and was considering actresses, including Suki Waterhouse, to star. In May 2016, Hooper was confirmed as director.

In January 2018, Hooper and Working Title began officially casting for the film, while looking into the technical aspect of whether the film would be entirely live-action or computer generated, with Lloyd Webber announcing he would be writing a new song for the film adaptation. On October 24, 2019, it was announced that the new song was titled "Beautiful Ghosts", written by Lloyd Webber and Taylor Swift. The song was sung by Francesca Hayward, followed later in a reprise by Judi Dench, with a credits version sung by Swift. The version sung by Swift was released on November 15, 2019.

Casting
In June 2018, there were reports that Anne Hathaway was considered for a role in the film, but she passed due to a scheduling conflict. Hugh Jackman was also offered a role by Hooper but turned it down. In July 2018, Jennifer Hudson, Taylor Swift, James Corden, and Ian McKellen joined the cast. Swift had previously tested for the role of Éponine in Tom Hooper's Les Misérables but was given the part of Bombalurina without an audition.

In September 2018, Laurie Davidson and Mette Towley were cast, with Steven Spielberg announced to be executive producing. In October 2018, Idris Elba and Judi Dench joined the cast of the film. Dench was cast in the original stage musical, but had been forced to pull out due to a torn Achilles tendon; Lloyd Webber and Hooper decided to make Old Deuteronomy a female cat and offered her the role.

In November 2018, ballet dancers Francesca Hayward and Steven McRae as well as Rebel Wilson, Jason Derulo, and Robert Fairchild joined the cast of the film with rehearsals commencing at Leavesden Studios in Hertfordshire, England. Andy Blankenbuehler choreographed the film, after Wayne McGregor was forced to back out due to scheduling conflicts. Blankenbuehler also choreographed the stage musical's 2016 Broadway revival. In December 2018, Les Twins and Eric Underwood joined the cast.

Filming
Principal photography began on December 12, 2018, and wrapped on April 2, 2019. Swift said that the cast attended "cat school", in which "We would literally do hours on end of barefoot crawling on the floor, hissing at each other. We learned about cat instincts and the way they carry themselves and the way that they process information, the way they see the world, the way they move."

Music 

Music for the film was composed by Andrew Lloyd Webber with contributions from producer Greg Wells, who was initially brought in after production in mid-2019. The recordings were created partly at Abbey Road Studios with contributions from the London Symphony Orchestra. Wells also played a number of instruments on the music himself, including the drums, pipe organ, bass guitar and Abbey Road's fabled Mrs Mills piano, used in Beatles songs such as "Penny Lane" and "With a Little Help from My Friends".

A "highlights" edition of the soundtrack with a running time of 59 minutes was released on December 20, 2019, by Polydor Records and in the US by Republic Records. The song "Beautiful Ghosts" by Taylor Swift, a single from the soundtrack album, was released on November 15, 2019.

Less than two months before the film was scheduled to be released in theatres, production was still ongoing for the music in the film.

Musical numbers

 "Overture"/"Prologue: Jellicle Songs for Jellicle Cats" – Orchestra/Company
 "The Naming of Cats"/"The Invitation to the Jellicle Ball" – Munkustrap, Mr. Mistoffelees & Company
 "Jennyanydots: The Old Gumbie Cat" – Jennyanydots, Munkustrap & Company
 "The Rum Tum Tugger" – Rum Tum Tugger, Jennyanydots & Company
 "Grizabella: The Glamour Cat" – Grizabella, Cassandra, Demeter & Company
 "Bustopher Jones: The Cat About Town" – Bustopher, Rum Tum Tugger, Maitre D' & Company
 "Mungojerrie and Rumpleteazer" – Mungojerrie, Rumpleteazer & Victoria
 "Growltiger's Last Stand" – Growltiger
 "Old Deuteronomy" – Munkustrap, Old Deuteronomy & Company
 "The Jellicle Ball" – Company
 "Memory (Prelude)"/"Beautiful Ghosts" – Grizabella & Victoria
 "The Moments of Happiness" – Old Deuteronomy
 "Gus: The Theatre Cat" – Gus
 "Skimbleshanks: The Railway Cat" – Skimbleshanks, Munkustrap & Company
 "Macavity: The Mystery Cat" – Bombalurina, Macavity, Mungojerrie, Rumpleteazer, Griddlebone & Company
 "Mr. Mistoffelees" – Mistoffelees, Munkustrap & Company
 "Memory" – Grizabella & Victoria
 "Beautiful Ghosts (Reprise)" – Victoria & Old Deuteronomy
 "The Journey to the Heaviside Layer" – Company
 "Finale: The Ad-Dressing of Cats" – Old Deuteronomy & Company

Visual effects 
Cats uses extensive visual effects throughout to convert the live-action actors into computer-animated cats. However, during the production process, the film was originally going to include makeup effects and costume design with fur for the characters. Hooper had experimented with using prosthetics to create the look of the cats due to the then-prohibitive costs of visual effects, but the director was dissatisfied, feeling that "[Y]ou ended up with full-faced prosthetics where you lost so much emotion. [...] So all the paths seemed to lead me back to visual effects." Other reasons of changing visual direction was due to difficulties for most actors and dancers when testing the catsuits, giving much heat and sweat during rehearsals. 
When production moved to digital options, companies like Technicolor SA subsidiaries Mill Film and MPC joined in for the visual effects. To aid this, the actors performed in motion capture suits with tracking dots on their costumes and faces. The bodies of the cat characters were rendered with digital fur which was blended with the actors' actual faces.

Substantial work on the VFX for Cats was performed at MPC Vancouver, which had previously worked on re-doing the visual effects for Sonic the Hedgehog. A report by The Daily Beast revealed a troubled production, where sources within one of the VFX studios reported the staff was working 80–90 hour weeks to try and finish the effects by the release date while Hooper would send them denigrating emails about their work and insult them during conferences. This was additionally complicated by Hooper's lack of familiarity with the visual effects process and animation as a whole, where the director would demand entire complete renders be made at great cost or that real-life references of cats be used for every movement. The team spent six months producing the film's two-minute trailer, leaving just four months to finish the entire 110-minute film.  The film's visuals were completed just hours before its premiere.

At the 92nd Academy Awards, Corden and Wilson appeared in character as Bustopher Jones and Jennyanydots, mocking the film's CGI while presenting Best Visual Effects. This led to criticism from the production's VFX animators, many of whom were laid off when MPC Vancouver closed following the film's production, as well as condemnation by the Visual Effects Society, an organization representing the VFX industry. The film's visual effects were also mocked in the 2022 Disney film Chip 'n' Dale: Rescue Rangers, in a scene where the titular characters notice two alley cats resembling the ones in the film as they venture through an "uncanny valley" part of town.

Marketing 
On April 6, 2019, Hudson performed "Memory" at the Las Vegas CinemaCon, along with a behind-the-scenes look with the film's cast and crew. On July 17, 2019, Universal released a behind-the-scenes featurette detailing the various aspects of production and featuring interviews with the cast and crew.

The first trailer was released on July 18, 2019, and received overwhelmingly negative reactions from viewers. Many viewers were unsettled by the mix of CGI and live-action used to portray the cats, and cited the effects as an example of the uncanny valley, with some comparing it unfavourably to the design of Sonic in the first trailer of the then-upcoming film Sonic the Hedgehog, which sparked similar criticism that ultimately resulted in the character being redesigned and the film being delayed. The studio spent about $115 million on global promotions and advertisements.

Release
The film premiered at Alice Tully Hall at the Lincoln Center in New York City on December 16, 2019 and was theatrically released in the United Kingdom and United States on December 20, 2019.

CGI errors and modified release
The film's original release contained numerous CGI errors and glitches, such as one scene in which Judi Dench's human hand, complete with her wedding ring, appears instead of Old Deuteronomy's cat paw. After poor reviews, Universal notified cinemas on opening day that an updated Digital Cinema Package with "some improved visual effects" would be available for download on 22 December, urging them to replace the current print as soon as possible.  Studio executives and cinema owners said that the decision to release a modified version of a film already in wide release was "unheard of".

Home media
Cats was released digitally on March 17, 2020, and on Blu-ray Disc and DVD on April 7 in the United States. The film was released on April 29, 2020, in Australia and on June 1, 2020, in the United Kingdom.

Reception

Box office
Cats grossed $27.2 million in the United States and Canada, and $47.4 million in other territories, for a worldwide total of $74.6 million against a production budget of about $95 million. Deadline Hollywood calculated the net loss of the film to be $113.6million.

In the United States and Canada, Cats was initially projected to gross $15–20 million in its opening weekend. Universal hoped that the film would appeal to young women as counterprogramming against Star Wars: The Rise of Skywalker, and emphasized Swift in marketing; however, she did not heavily promote the film to her fans, as she only appeared for one song. After making $2.6 million on its opening day (including $550,000 from Thursday night previews), estimates for Cats were lowered to $7 million. Ultimately, the film only debuted to $6.5 million, finishing fourth at the box office. The poor performance was attributed to negative reception of the trailers, poor reviews, and competition from The Rise of Skywalker.

In its second weekend, Cats made $4.8 million (for a total of $8.7 million over the five-day Christmas period), finishing in eighth place. It then made $2.6 million in its third weekend, finishing tenth.

Critical response
The site's critics consensus reads: "Despite its fur-midable cast, this Cats adaptation is a clawful mistake that will leave most viewers begging to be put out of their mew-sery." On review aggregator Metacritic, the film has a weighted average score of 32 out of 100 based on 51 critics, indicating "generally unfavorable reviews". Audiences polled by CinemaScore gave the film an average grade of "C+" on an A+ to F scale, while those at PostTrak gave it an average 0.5 out of 5 stars, with 30% saying they would definitely recommend it. In a June 2021 editorial titled "Rotten Tomatoes Is Wrong about Cats", they asked if the film was shaping up to be a "cult classic in the making".

Peter Debruge of Variety called the film "one of those once-in-a-blue-moon embarrassments that mars the résumés of great actors (poor Idris Elba, already scarred enough as the villainous Macavity) and trips up the careers of promising newcomers (like ballerina Francesca Hayward, whose wide-eyed, mouth-agape Victoria displays one expression for the entire movie)." He criticized the direction and effects, and predicted that the film would appeal to furries, though many in the furry fandom also found the effects disturbing. David Rooney of The Hollywood Reporter felt that the film was "hobbled by a major misjudgment in its central visual concept", lamenting its execution (such as the poor proportions of the "cats" to their environments) and deeming the film "exhausting". Peter Travers of Rolling Stone rated the film 0 out of 5 stars, stating it was "bizarre", had terrible special effects, and made the audience "want to cry for mercy", while Hooper "traps the actors in an airless, lifeless bubble of a film that scarcely gives them room to breathe, much less develop a character".

In the Los Angeles Times, Justin Chang wrote that "With its grotesque design choices and busy, metronomic editing, Cats is as uneasy on the eyes as a Hollywood spectacle can be, tumbling into an uncanny valley between mangy realism and dystopian artifice." Debruge said that the film should have used "face paint and Lycra" like the musical. Simran Hans of The Observer agreed that "many of its uncanny images are sure to haunt viewers for generations". Her one-star review described the film as "a clear career low" for most of the actors, wondering whether they "are aware of what they've gotten themselves into". Peter Bradshaw for The Guardian agreed with the one-star rating. In a review parodying "The Naming of Cats", he criticized the visual style and particularly the character design, while lambasting the film as a "dreadful hairball of woe". Manohla Dargis of The New York Times felt that Hooper had made "a robust effort" to adapt the stage musical—which "was always going to be difficult, particularly once the decision was made to create a live-action version rather than an animated one"—and "enlisted some talented performers", but that the film version suffered from a lack of the human connection that theatre involves, where performers and audience share a space, without which "all that's left are canned images of fit-looking people meowing and raising their rumps high in the air".

The Hollywood Reporter named Cats one of the ten worst films of 2019, Travers said it "easily scores as the bottom of the 2019 barrel—and arguably of the decade", and Adam Graham of The Detroit News said "Cats is the biggest disaster of the decade, and possibly thus far in the millennium. It's Battlefield Earth with whiskers." Alex Cranz of io9 warned "I have seen sights no human should see" but said others "must witness" Hooper's, the actors', and Hollywood's hubris, citing a human being appearing in a group of cats, a cat-coloured woman without fur, and other examples of how "the shit's just not finished." Ty Burr of The Boston Globes half-star review said "there are moments in 'Cats' I would gladly pay to unsee" and warned small children to not watch the film. He reported that the preview audience laughed like the reaction to Springtime for Hitler during Dench's "The Ad-dressing of Cats", because each pause in her lyrics seemed to be the end of the film ("at long last") before continuing. Patrick Gibbs of SLUG Magazine said that "There is not enough kitty litter in the world to cover up this mess."

Pete Hammond of Deadline complimented Taylor Swift's performance as Bombalurina and her signature "Macavity" number, as well as "Beautiful Ghosts", which she wrote along with Lloyd Webber. Critic Guy Lodge called Swift "the best thing in the film" and "the one performer who completely hits their marks and pulls off the lone successful number," while critic Rebecca Lewis described Swift's performance as "one of the few genuinely good parts of the film". Patrick Ryan of USA Today stated that Swift "makes the most of her brief screen time, bringing her unabating charisma to the flirtatious feline ... if there's one thing that's disappointing about Swift's performance, it's that there isn't more of it". Hans said that she was the only actor "who seems to be having fun, perhaps because she only appears in the film for approximately 10 minutes." Jennifer Hudson similarly received praise for her rendition of "Memory", with some critics describing it as "the best part" of the film and "the sole musical number in the new movie that summons real feeling".

Lloyd Webber himself was critical of the film, calling it "ridiculous" in an interview with The Sunday Times, saying, "The problem with the film was that Tom Hooper decided that he didn't want anybody involved in it who was involved in the original show." He later revealed in an interview with The Daily Telegraph that "I wrote to the head of Universal and said, 'You've got a car crash on your hands unless you get a grip on this thing', a year before they made (it). I didn't even get a reply." In a 2021 interview with Variety, Lloyd Webber claimed his negative reaction to the film had even directly inspired him to adopt a Havanese dog.

Rich Juzwiak of Jezebel predicted in early January 2020 that Cats might become a cult classic like The Rocky Horror Picture Show, noting that costumed screenings in Brooklyn and sing-along screenings in Toronto and Los Angeles were selling out. , Milwaukee's Oriental Theatre, Coolidge Corner Theatre near Boston, and FilmScene in Iowa City are among notable small theaters showing Cats. Coolidge Corner gives Rocky Horror-like viewing instructions to audiences at its monthly showings.

Accolades
On December 26, 2019, it was reported that Universal had removed Cats from its For Your Consideration web page. The film was not available on the Academy of Motion Picture Arts and Sciences' private streaming media platform for award contenders.

In popular culture
It was parodied by RiffTrax on September 2, 2022.

See also
 List of films considered the worst

References

External links 
 
 
 Official RiffTrax preview

2019 films
2010s musical fantasy films
Amblin Entertainment films
American musical fantasy films
British musical fantasy films
Cats (musical)
Films about cats
Films based on adaptations
Films based on multiple works
Films based on musicals
Films directed by Tom Hooper
Films produced by Eric Fellner
Films produced by Tim Bevan
Films set in London
Films shot in Hertfordshire
Films shot at Warner Bros. Studios, Leavesden
Films with screenplays by Lee Hall (playwright)
Films using motion capture
Golden Raspberry Award winning films
Musicals by Andrew Lloyd Webber
Sung-through musical films
Universal Pictures films
Working Title Films films
2010s English-language films
Advertising and marketing controversies in film
2010s American films
2010s British films